The argument from free will, also called the paradox of free will or theological fatalism, contends that omniscience and free will are incompatible and that any conception of God that incorporates both properties is therefore inconceivable. See the various controversies over claims of God's omniscience, in particular the critical notion of foreknowledge. These arguments are deeply concerned with the implications of predestination.

Omniscience and free will

Some arguments against the existence of God focus on the supposed incoherence of humankind possessing free will and God's omniscience. These arguments are deeply concerned with the implications of predestination.

Noted Jewish philosopher Moses Maimonides described the conflict between divine omnipotence and his creation's person's free will, in traditional terms of good and evil actions, as follows:

A "standard Anglican" theologian gave a similar description of Christian revelation:

A logical formulation of this argument might go as follows:
 God knows choice "C" that a human would claim to "make freely".
 It is now necessary that C.
 If it is now necessary that C, then C cannot be otherwise (this is the definition of “necessary”). That is, there are no actual "possibilities" due to predestination.
 If you cannot do otherwise when you act, you do not act freely (Principle of Alternate Possibilities)
 Therefore, when you do an act, you will not do it freely.

Norman Swartz, however, contends that the above arguments commit the modal fallacy. In particular, he asserts that these arguments assume that if C is true, it becomes necessary for C to be true, which is incorrect as C is contingent (see modal logic). Otherwise, one can argue that the future is set already regardless of his actions.

Other means of reconciling God's omniscience with human free will have been proposed. Some have attempted to redefine or reconceptualize free will:
 God can know in advance what I will do, because free will is to be understood only as freedom from coercion, and anything further is an illusion. This is the move made by compatibilistic philosophies.
 The sovereignty (autonomy) of God, existing within a free agent, provides strong inner compulsions toward a course of action (calling), and the power of choice (election). The actions of a human are thus determined by a human acting on relatively strong or weak urges (both from God and the environment around them) and their own relative power to choose.

A proposition first offered by Boethius and later by Thomas Aquinas and C. S. Lewis, suggests that God's perception of time is different, and that this is relevant to our understanding of our own free will. In his book Mere Christianity, Lewis argues that God is actually outside time and therefore does not "foresee" events, but rather simply observes them all at once. He explains:

A common objection is to argue that Molinism, or the belief that God can know counterfactually the actions of his creations, is true. This has been used as an argument by Alvin Plantinga and William Lane Craig, amongst others.

Free will argument for the nonexistence of God
Dan Barker suggests that this can lead to a "Free will Argument for the Nonexistence of God" on the grounds that God's omniscience is incompatible with God having free will and that if God does not have free will God is not a personal being.

Theists generally agree that God is a personal being and that God is omniscient, but there is some disagreement about whether "omniscient" means:
 "knows everything that God chooses to know and that is logically possible to know"; or instead the slightly stronger:
 "knows everything that is logically possible to know"

These two terms are known as inherent and total omniscience, respectively.

Argument for the existence of God
God's omniscience is not incompatible with free will. God pre-cognizes but does not pre-defines the choice of every soul.

To make the choice free, its enough for God to hide all the information leaks to preserve the choice to be independent from God's precognition.

See also
 
 Determinism
 List of paradoxes
 Molinism

Notes

References

Further reading
 Thomas Aquinas. Summa Contra Gentiles
 Thomas Aquinas. Summa Theologica I, Q. XIV, esp. Art. 13: "Whether the Knowledge of God is of Future Contingent Things?".
 Boethius. The Consolation of Philosophy. Many editions.
 Hasker, William. God, Time, and Foreknowledge". Ithaca: Cornell University Press, 1998.
 Molina, Luis de. On Divine Foreknowledge, trans. Alfred J. Freddoso. Ithaca: Cornell University Press, 1988.
 Plantinga, Alvin. "On Ockham's Way Out". Faith and Philosophy 3 (3): 235–269.
 Ockham, William. Predestination, God's Foreknowledge, and Future Contingents,  trans. M.M. Adams and N. Kretzmann. Indianapolis: Hackett Publishing Company, 1983.
 Zagzebski, Linda. "The Dilemma of Freedom an Foreknowledge". New York: Oxford University Press, 1991.
 Luther, Martin: De servo arbitrio, in English: On the Bondage of the Will. In Latin and German 1525, in modern English: J.I. Packer and O. R. Johnston, trans. Old Tappan, New Jersey: Fleming H. Revell Co., 1957.

External links
 Foreknowledge and Free Will article in the Internet Encyclopedia of Philosophy Omniscience and Divine Foreknowledge article in the Internet Encyclopedia of Philosophy''
 The Paradox of Free will – An online  discussion
 Thomas Aquinas. Summa Theologica I, Q. XIV, Art. 13.

Free will, argument from
Free will
Philosophical paradoxes